Lithuania has 30 regional parks and 1 protected landscape and 1 cultural reserve. All under V IUCN protected area category. Law on establishing regional parks took effect in 1992.

See also 
List of protected areas of Lithuania

References 

 
Regional Parks